The Anglican Diocese of Isi Mbano (formerly Okigwe North) is one of 12 within the Anglican Province of Owerri, itself one of 14 provinces within the Church of Nigeria. The  current bishop is Godson Udochukwu Ukanwa.

Notes

Church of Nigeria dioceses
Dioceses of the Province of Owerri